The Hull–Chelsea–Wakefield Railway was a  heritage railway in Quebec, Canada, running tourist trains through the scenic Gatineau Hills and beside the Gatineau River between Hull (part of the city of Gatineau) and the tourist town of Wakefield (part of La Pêche municipality) from May to October, using a 1907 Swedish steam locomotive, E2 class number 909, and 1940s-built Swedish passenger cars. On average, the railway attracted about 50 000 tourists and generated revenues of about $8 million for the region.

The line was closed by a 2011 track bed washout and  has not re-opened. Cost to repair is estimated above $5 million.

History 
The Hull–Chelsea–Wakefield Railway ran on a track that was originally a Canadian Pacific Railway branch line that at one time extended beyond Wakefield to Maniwaki. As of 2008 the track is owned by the Chemin de fer de l'Outaouais.

The railway line had been plagued in recent years with repeated damage to the track bed caused by severe storms. Some sections of the track run through steep terrain and along the bank of the Gatineau River, making it susceptible to such washouts. In 2007, a disagreement erupted between the owner of the steam train line and the municipality of Chelsea and city of Gatineau over the railway safety and maintenance. In July, a rain storm caused damage to some parts of the railway. The owner of the steam train mentioned that without funding from the cities, he would have to cease the operations of the line and sell the steam train. In November, an agreement was made when the province of Quebec and the municipalities involved provided funding for studies into future improvements to the railway.

However, following a landslide in Chelsea during the spring of 2008, the railway was halted after two weekends of activity. The owner decided to sell the train and ceased activities. The railway did not run for the summer of 2008.

Although operations resumed for 2009 and 2010, and various upgrades were considered, a notice on the official website currently states that they have been suspended again after heavy rains damaged the tracks during a storm that occurred on June 23 and 24, 2011. The train was once again put up for sale.

Return 
The train is now owned by the Chemin de fer de l'Outaouais. An attempt to obtain $5 million in provincial funding for track repair was rejected in January 2014.  CCFO is continuing to seek private or governmental backing by August 2014 for a possible relaunch no earlier than 2015, although the vulnerability of the right-of-way to future washouts remains an undetermined risk.

In 2016, a consortium, Moose Rail, proposed Wakefield as a stop for a new privately run Ottawa-Gatineau commuter train service.

In July 2017 the municipality of Chelsea, Quebec pulled up  of the track, seemingly ending any hopes of reopening the line.

One rail car and the locomotive were sold, the rest have been scrapped and chopped up as of 2019. Thus ended the service for ever.

See also
 Letsgomoose
 List of heritage railways in Canada 
 1904 in rail transport
 Quebec Gatineau Railway

References

External links 
 Government of Canada
 Steamtrain friends
 Gatineau Hull Chelsea Wakefield steam train
 Steam train on facebook

Heritage railways in Quebec
Transport in Gatineau